Hossein Hamedani, also spelled Hamedani (December 15, 1950 – October 7, 2015), was an Iranian Revolutionary Guard commander. He was posthumously promoted to a Major General.

Biography
Hamadani was born in Abadan, Iran. His parents were originally from Hamadan.

Hamadani first rose to prominence during the 1979 Kurdish rebellion in Iran and the Iran–Iraq War, where he helped suppress the Communist rebellion in Iranian Kurdistan. Mohammad Ali Jafari appointed him as Deputy Commander of the IRGC in 2005, and together they planned how to deal with any attempted "velvet revolution" in Iran. Hamadani subsequently helped to suppress the 2009 election protests in Iran. He had been head of the IRGC's Rassoulollah Corps in charge of Greater Tehran from November 2009 until January 2014, and had been subject to international sanctions since 14 April 2011.

Hamadani had written three books:
 Moonlight of Khayyen), narrating the Iranian Revolution, conflicts in Kordestan, and the Iran–Iraq War.
 Conquerors of Khorramshahr, narrating the Liberation of Khorramshahr.
 Brother, It's Duty, an autobiography.

Hamadani also served in Syria as both an advisor to the Syrian army during the Syrian Civil War and as overseer for Quds Force operations in support of the Syrian government.

Hamadani was killed in an ISIL attack in Aleppo, Syria on 7 October 2015.

References

External links

1950 births
2015 deaths
Islamic Revolutionary Guard Corps brigadier generals
Islamic Revolutionary Guard Corps personnel of the Iran–Iraq War
Iranian military personnel killed in action
Recipients of the Order of Fath
Military personnel killed in the Syrian civil war
Islamic Revolutionary Guard Corps personnel of the Syrian civil war
Quds Force personnel